Geir Gulliksen (born 31 October 1963) is a Norwegian poet, novelist, playwright, children's writer, essayist and publisher. He was born in Kongsberg.

Biography 
He made his literary debut in 1986 with the novel Mørkets munn. Among his early poetry collections are Steder: på torget from 1990, and monografi from 1995.

He is chief editor for the publishing house Forlaget Oktober.
In 2008 he was awarded the Mads Wiel Nygaard's Endowment.

References

1963 births
Living people
People from Kongsberg
20th-century Norwegian poets
Norwegian male poets
20th-century Norwegian novelists
21st-century Norwegian novelists
Norwegian essayists
Norwegian children's writers
Norwegian dramatists and playwrights
Norwegian male novelists
Norwegian male dramatists and playwrights
Male essayists
20th-century essayists
21st-century essayists
20th-century Norwegian male writers
21st-century Norwegian male writers